Gausachs is a surname of Catalan origin. Notable people with the surname include:

 Josep Gausachs (1889–1959), Catalan artist
 Marcel·lí Gausachs (1891–1931), Catalan photographer

See also
 

Surnames of Catalan origin